Sclerasterias is a genus of starfish in the family Asteriidae.  Adult individuals have five arms but small, immature individuals have six. This led to the giving of a separate generic name to the juveniles, Hydrasterias, before it was realised that only one genus was involved. These young individuals often undergo fissiparity. The disc splits into two parts, each bearing three arms, and new arms develop on each part to complete the complement of arms. This sometimes happens repeatedly and may be an adaptation to life in cold, deep seas where most of the species are found.

Species
The following species are accepted by the World Register of Marine Species:

 Sclerasterias alexandri (Ludwig, 1905)
 Sclerasterias contorta (Perrier, 1881)
 Sclerasterias dubia (H. L. Clark, 1909)
 Sclerasterias eructans (McKnight, 2006)
 Sclerasterias euplecta (Fisher, 1906)
 Sclerasterias eustyla (Sladen, 1889)
 Sclerasterias guernei Perrier, 1891
 Sclerasterias heteropaes Fisher, 1924
 Sclerasterias mazophora (Wood-Mason & Alcock, 1891)
 Sclerasterias mollis (Hutton, 1872)
 Sclerasterias neglecta (Perrier, 1891)
 Sclerasterias parvulus (Perrier, 1891)
 Sclerasterias richardi (Perrier, 1882)
 Sclerasterias satsumana Doderlein, 1902
 Sclerasterias tanneri (Verrill, 1880)

References

Asteriidae